García Álvarez de Toledo y Osorio, 4th Marquess of Villafranca del Bierzo  (29 August 1514 – 31 May 1577), was a Spanish general and politician.

Biography 
He was born at Villafranca del Bierzo, the son of  Pedro Álvarez de Toledo, Maquesss of Villafranca, Viceroy of Naples between 1532 and 1553. His mother was Juana Pimentel, Marchioness of Villafranca del Bierzo. The famous Duke of Alba, Fernando Álvarez de Toledo, was his first cousin.  Among his many siblings was Eleonora of Toledo, wife of Cosimo I, Grand Duke of Tuscany.

He started his military career under the command of Andrea Doria in the galleys of Naples, as commander of two ships. In 1535, already the commander of six galleys, he distinguished himself in the battles of La Goletta, Tunis, Algiers, Sfax, Calibria y Mebredia.  After this he was named Capitain General of the Galleys of Naples.

He was Capitain General of the expedition to Greece, and Capitán General del Mar, a title he received in 1544 after having fought Hayreddin Barbarossa. He was Viceroy of Catalonia between 1558 and 1564. He then became Colonel General of the Infantry of the Kingdom of Naples and finally, between 1564 and 1566, Viceroy of Sicily.

As Viceroy of Sicily he accomplished his two greatest achievements: the conquest of Peñón de Vélez de la Gomera in 1564, and the relief of the Siege of Malta (1565). For this he received from King Philip II of Spain the titles Duke of Fernandina and Prince of Montalbán on 24 December 1569. He died at Naples in 1577.

Marriage and children 
In 1552, in Naples, the Duke married Donna Vittoria Colonna, the daughter of Don Ascanio Colonna, 2nd Duke of Paliano, and Giovanna d'Aragona and the niece of famed poet and diplomat Vittoria Colonna, with whom she shares a name. They had six children:

 Pedro de Toledo Osorio, 5th Marquess of Villafranca and Grandee of Spain;
 María de Toledo, married Fadrique Álvarez de Toledo, 4th Duke of Alba;
 Juana de Toledo, married Bernardino Pimentel, 3rd Marquess of Távara;
 Leonor de Toledo, married her cousin Pietro de' Medici, Prince of Tuscany;
 Ana de Toledo, married Gómez Dávila, 3rd Marquess of Velada;
 Inés de Toledo, married Juan Pacheco, 2nd Marquess of Cerralbo.

He also had two illegitimate children:

 Fadrique Álvarez de Toledo, Señor de Gaipuli;
 Delia de Toledo, a Carmelite nun.

Ancestry

References

1514 births
1577 deaths
People from El Bierzo
Garcia
101
16th-century Italian nobility
Marquesses of Spain
Spanish politicians
16th-century Spanish military personnel
Spanish admirals
Spanish diplomats
Viceroys of Catalonia
Viceroys of Sicily